Guillermo Coria was the defending champion, but did not participate this year.

Jiří Novák won the tournament, beating David Nalbandian in the final, 5–7, 6–3, 6–4, 1–6, 6–2.

Seeds

Draw

Finals

Top half

Bottom half

References

 Main Draw

2004 ATP Tour
2004 Davidoff Swiss Indoors